4th Street Feeling is the twelfth studio album by American rock musician Melissa Etheridge, released on September 4, 2012 by Island Records, produced by Jacquire King and Steve Booker, with all tracks co-produced by Etheridge. The album was recorded at the "House of Blues Studio" in Encino, California. It features twelve tracks on the standard release and three bonus tracks on the deluxe edition.

Reception

Rolling Stone gave it 3.5 stars out of 5, stating, "producers Jacquire King and Steve Booker deftly curb her over-the-top tendencies" and, "The restraint serves her well. She's realized that sometimes holding a little back can make what's there hit with all the more force."

People magazine awarded the album 3 out of 4 stars, while Entertainment Weekly rated the album a B+.

AllMusic was also positive, giving the album 3.5 stars out of 5, and wrote, "4th Street Feeling is largely a return to form for Etheridge; a record that reaffirms her place as a songwriter and recording artist who is in a class of her own.

Track listing
All songs written by Melissa Etheridge.

"Kansas City" – 3:20
"4th Street Feeling" – 3:33
"Falling Up" – 3:37
"Shout Now" – 3:17
"The Shadow of a Black Crow" – 3:18
"Be Real" – 3:52
"A Disaster" – 4:07
"Sympathy" – 3:52
"Enough Rain" – 2:49
"A Sacred Heart" – 4:23
"I Can Wait" – 3:30
"Rock and Roll Me" – 5:59

Bonus tracks

Personnel
Performance Credits
Melissa Etheridge – guitar, harmonica, piano, keyboards, vocals  
Steve Booker – keyboards  
Jon Kaplan – bass guitar 
Brett Simons – bass guitar
Zac Rae – keyboards  
Blair Sinta – drums

Technical Credits
Melissa Etheridge – Producer  
Steve Booker – Producer  
Richard Dodd – Mastering  
Jon Kaplan – Additional Production  
Doug Joswick – Package Production  
Jacquire King – Producer, Engineer  
Marc VanGool – Guitar Technician  
Eric Wong – Marketing  
Brad Bivens – Engineer  
Kristen Yiengst – Art Direction  
Smit – Engineer  
Steven Defino – Art Direction  
David Grant – Marketing  
Oliver Straus – Engineer  
Dave Morris – Marketing

Charts

References

2012 albums
Melissa Etheridge albums
Island Records albums
Albums produced by Jacquire King
Albums produced by Steve Booker (producer)